Admiral Samuel Shelburne Robison CB, USN (May 10, 1867 – November 20, 1952) was a United States Navy officer whose service extended from the 1890s through the early 1930s.  He held several major commands during World War I, and from 1928 to 1931 served as Superintendent of the United States Naval Academy. In 1933, Admiral Robison also founded a Naval Preparatory Academy in Pine Beach, New Jersey called Admiral Farragut Academy.

Early life and career
Robison was born on May 10, 1867, in Juniata County, Pennsylvania. He entered the United States Naval Academy on September 4, 1884.

In 1896 he returned to the Asiatic Station in Boston. In August 1899 he was assigned to the League Island Navy Yard, Philadelphia, Pennsylvania. He joined Alabama (BB-8) September 15, 1900, and two years later was transferred to Hull (DD-7), a torpedo boat destroyer. From September 1904 to July 1906, he served with the Bureau of Equipment at Washington, D.C., then he returned to sea, serving first in Tennessee (CA-10) and later in Pennsylvania (ACR-4).

After a tour of duty in the Bureau of Engineering, he assumed command of Cincinnati (C-7), a unit of the Asiatic Fleet, on October 25, 1911. He held the rank of captain from July 1, 1914, and he remained with Jupiter until August 8.

World War I service
For this duty he was awarded the Navy Cross. He was also made an Honorary Companion of the Order of the Bath for service to the British during the war.

In October 1918 he assumed command of Squadron 3, Patrol Force, and during the next month had additional duty as District Commander, Brest, France. In November, he was appointed U.S. Naval Representative on the Commission for executing the Naval Terms of the Armistice with Germany. After his return to the United States in March 1919, he commanded the Boston Navy Yard. In May 1921, he was sent to Santo Domingo as Military Governor, serving until October 1922, when Santo Domingo was turned back over to civilian control.

Post-war service and retirement
A member of the General Board of the Navy from December 1922 until June 1923, he was appointed Commander in Chief, Battle Fleet, with the rank of admiral, from June 30, 1923. With USS Seattle (ACR-11) as his flagship, he commanded the United States Fleet during the year commencing August 1925. He then became Commandant of the 13th Naval District with the permanent rank of rear admiral. From June 1928 until his retirement in June 1931, he served as Superintendent of the Naval Academy.

For a number of years after his retirement, Admiral Robison was Superintendent of the Admiral Farragut Academy, Toms River. He died in Glendale, California, on November 20, 1952.

Publications 
A History of naval tactics from 1530-1930 : the evolution of tactical maxims, by Samuel Shelburne Robison and Mary Louise Robison, pub U.S. Naval Institute, 1942.
Manual of wireless telegraphy for the use of naval electricians, by Samuel Shelburne Robison et al, pub United States Navy Department, Bureau of Equipment, 1906, 1909, 1911, 1915.

See also

List of Superintendents of the United States Naval Academy

1867 births
1952 deaths
United States Navy personnel of World War I
Honorary Companions of the Order of the Bath
Recipients of the Navy Cross (United States)
People from Juniata County, Pennsylvania
Submariners
United States Naval Academy alumni
United States Navy admirals
Superintendents of the United States Naval Academy
Military personnel from Pennsylvania